Songjiang (formerly romanized as Sungkiang) was a large town and the seat of Songjiang County in Shanghai.  In 1998, Songjiang County was changed to Songjiang District and, in 2001, Songjiang was abolished to become . 
Songjiang is located southwest of Shanghai city proper.

It also has the Mazu Cultural Palace, a temple to the Chinese sea-goddess Mazu, a deified medieval Fujianese teenager. The temple was previously located in downtown Shanghai, but its ruins were moved and reassembled for Songjiang's park.

West of Songjiang is an old mosque, part of which dates to the Yuan dynasty and is said to be one of the oldest Islamic buildings in China. Even today it is still a place of Muslim worship.

Most of the Chinese men fighting in the Ever-Victorious Army against the Taiping Rebellion in the 1850s were originally from Songjiang.

References 

Township-level divisions of Shanghai
Songjiang District